José María Pérez de Urdininea (31 October 1784 – 4 November 1865) was a Bolivian military officer and statesman who served as the third president of Bolivia in 1828. He was the first Bolivian president to be born in Bolivia itself. He fought with the patriots against the Argentines in Peru. Despite being President for only three months, Pérez held a number of important positions in the Bolivian government including Minister of War between 1841 and 1847.

Early life

Youth and the Spanish American Wars of Independence 
José María Pérez de Urdininea was born in the Anquioma hacienda, near Luribay on 31 October 1784. He studied at the La Paz seminary before later studying in Cochabamba. He joined the Bolivian War of Independence in 1809, fighting in the Battle of Huaqui, after which he was taken wounded to Argentina where he joined the army of Manuel Belgrano and fought in the Battle of Tucumán and the Battle of Salta during the Argentine War of Independence. He fought from 1811 to 1821 under the command of various other Argentine leaders including José Rondeau, Martín Miguel de Güemes, and José de San Martín. 

From 1822 to 1823 he was the Governor of San Juan Province, where he formed an army of 500 men under the command of José María Paz to invade Upper Peru. In early 1825, together with Governor of Salta Juan Antonio Álvarez de Arenales, Pérez received the surrender of the last Spanish royalist chief in the territory of Río de la Plata.

The Bolivian Republic and Presidency

Acting President 
Bolivian President Antonio José de Sucre incorporated Pérez into the Bolivian Army, appointing him Minister of War on 9 December 1827 and later President of the Council of Ministers. It was in this capacity that he took command of the government on 18 April 1828 after Sucre was wounded in an army revolt. Accused of not having faced the invasion of Agustín Gamarra, Pérez retired to one of his estates for more than ten years.

The War of the Confederation and death 
In 1838, Marshal Andrés de Santa Cruz, then President of Bolivia and Protector of the Peru–Bolivian Confederation, reincorporated him into the army. He participated in the Battle of Yungay which ultimately resulted in the dissolution of the Peru-Bolivian Confederation. He served again as Minister of War during the governments of José Ballivián in 1843 and Jorge Córdova from 1855 to 1857. He died on 4 November 1865.

References

Bibliography 
 

1784 births
1865 deaths
19th-century Argentine military personnel
19th-century Bolivian politicians
Argentine generals
Bolivian generals
Córdova administration cabinet members
Defense ministers of Bolivia
Governors of San Juan Province, Argentina
José Ballivián administration cabinet members
People from José Ramón Loayza Province
People of the Argentine War of Independence
People of the Bolivian War of Independence
Presidents of Bolivia
Presidents of the Chamber of Deputies (Bolivia)